Joseph Bernard Gildenhorn (born September 17, 1929), was the U.S. Ambassador to Switzerland (1989-1993), a partner in the law firm of Brown, Gildenhorn and Jacobs (Washington, DC), and Founder, Officer and Director of JBG Smith, a since publicly quoted real estate development and management firm.

A native of Washington, D.C., Gildenhorn graduated from Woodrow Wilson High School, the University of Maryland (B.S. degree in Business Administration), and Yale Law School in 1954 and was a member of the Editorial Board of the Yale Law Journal and Order of the Coif.

JBG Smith
JBG Smith began in what has been described as a small law firm that began in 1956 by Gildenhorn and high school friends Donald Brown and Gerald Miller.  About ten years later, the principals of Miller, Brown and Gildenhorn decided to become real estate developers in the Washington, D.C., area.  The company is publicly traded and known as JBG Smith Properties Inc. In November 2018, Amazon chose one of their sites in Arlington County, Virginia to become a headquarters location.

References

External links

Woodrow Wilson High School (Washington, D.C.) alumni
1929 births
American real estate businesspeople
Lawyers from Washington, D.C.
Yale Law School alumni
University System of Maryland alumni
Ambassadors of the United States to Switzerland
Living people